Whedbee is a surname. Notable people with the surname include:

Bertha Whedbee (1876–1960), American suffragist and police officer
Charles H. Whedbee (1911–1990), American lawyer and judge
J. William Whedbee (1938–2004), American Biblical historian
Mel Whedbee (1904–1974), American football coach